Arvilla McGuire Manning (March 26, 1928 – August 17, 2013) was an American tennis player.

A native of Piedmont, California, McGuire ranked number one in the state for the 14s age division and was sixth in the United States for the 18s. She competed in four editions of the Wimbledon Championships, reaching the singles third round twice. In 1951 she was runner-up to Betty Lombard at the Irish Championships.

McGuire married Edward M. Manning, Jr. in 1956 and they had two sons.

References

1928 births
2013 deaths
American female tennis players
Tennis people from California
People from Piedmont, California